Marcellus (II) from the kindred Tétény (died after 1233) was a Hungarian influential lord in the Kingdom of Hungary, who served as Judge royal three times during the reign of Andrew II of Hungary.

Family
Marcellus II belonged to the gens Tétény as the eldest son of Marcellus I (or possibly Ambrose). It is plausible the clan possessed the initial ancient landholdings around Tétény in Central Hungary (present-day Budafok-Tétény, a southwest district of Budapest), including Sóskút and Tordas.

His brothers were Peter I, who functioned as Judge royal for the Queen from 1229 to 1230, and Abraham, who was ispán of Vas County (1233) and Sopron County (1235). Additionally, Fabian and Demetrius were also the brothers of him. Marcellus had no children. Among the five brothers, only Peter I had known descendants. Croatian historian Antun Nekić considered that Abraham was the son of Marcellus II and not his brother.

Career
In contemporary records, Marcellus was first mentioned as ispán of Sopron County in 1206. After that he served as ispán of Csanád County between 1206 and 1207. He was replaced by Peter, son of Töre. In 1207, he appeared in charters as Judge royal at the first time; perhaps he already held that position since 1206. Following that he functioned as ispán of Bihar County in 1208. He was head of Sopron County again from 1208 till 1209. According to royal charters, he governed Bács County between 1209 and 1210., and Nyitra County for a short time in 1210. Marcellus' political influence is well reflected by the fact that his brothers (Peter, Fabian and Demetrius) were usually styled as "frater Marcelli" or "germanus Marcelli".

Marcellus participated in King Andrew's royal campaign against the Principality of Halych in 1211, functioning as one of the commanders of the Hungarian army. He was appointed Judge royal for the second time in 1211 and held the office until the next year. Beside that he also functioned as ispán of Keve County between 1211 and 1212. Two years later, in 1214, he again served as Judge royal for the third and final time. He was also head of Csanád County during that time. For his faithful service, Marcellus was granted landholdings and estates across the Drava (including the extended lordship of Peker or Pukur in present-day Badljevina and the surrounding Osuvak), which he tried to expand by purchasing. His lands and estates were laying mostly south to the Drava River.

It is possible that Marcellus was present when Andrew II and Leszek the White, High Duke of Poland in Szepes (today Spiš, Slovakia) in the autumn of 1214, where they arranged the marriage between Coloman of Galicia and Salomea, and their alliance against regent Vladislav Kormilichich. Thereafter, Marcellus did not hold any offices in the royal court for unknown reasons. It is possible he took part in the Fifth Crusade in 1217–1218. Marcellus and Abraham were involved in a lawsuit over the land Toplica (present-day a borough of Daruvar in Croatia) near their ancient area Peker along the namesake river in 1232. They lost the case. Marcellus is referred to as the king's "former" chamberlain in 1233.

References

Sources

 
 
 
 
 

12th-century Hungarian people
13th-century Hungarian people
Judges royal
Date of birth unknown
Date of death unknown
Marcellus